X-ray specs or X-ray glasses are an American novelty item, purported to allow users to see through or into solid objects. In reality, the spectacles merely create an optical illusion; no X-rays are involved. The current paper version is sold under the name "X-Ray Spex"; a similar product is sold under the name "X-Ray Gogs".

Description

X-Ray Specs consist of an over-sized pair of spectacles with plastic or cardboard frames and white cardboard "lenses" printed with concentric red circles, and emblazoned with the legend "X-RAY VISION".

The "lenses" consist of two layers of thin cardboard with a small hole about a quarter-inch (6 millimeters) in diameter punched through both layers. The user views objects through the holes. In the original version, a feather is embedded between the layers of each lens. The vanes of the feathers are so close together that light is diffracted, causing the user to receive two slightly offset images. For instance, if viewing a pencil, one would see two offset images of the pencil. Where the images overlap, a darker image is obtained, giving the illusion that one is seeing the graphite embedded within the body of the pencil. Newer versions utilize manufactured diffraction lenses instead of feathers.

Value
X-Ray Specs were long advertised with the slogan "See the bones in your hand, see through clothes!" Some versions of the advertisement featured an illustration of a young man using the X-Ray Specs to examine the bones in his hand while a voluptuous woman stood in the background, as though awaiting her turn to be "X-rayed". These claims, however, were untrue. In smaller print below the X-ray claims, advertisements and packaging state that X-Ray Specs operate by "illusion".

Part of the novelty value lies in provoking the object of the wearer's attentions. These subjects may believe that the device does allow the wearer to compromise their modesty, so are liable to respond with a variety of amusing reactions. Indeed, instructions with the packaging explain how to provoke such reactions, to "CONVINCE the gals that your X-Ray Spex are for real!"

History
The principle behind the illusion, as well as its use in a pair of "spectacles", was first patented (in the United States) in 1906 by George W. Macdonald. A tubular configuration employing the same principle as well as the use of a feather for the diffraction grating was first patented in 1909 by Fred J. Wiedenbeck

X-Ray Specs were improved by Harold von Braunhut, also the inventor of Amazing Sea-Monkeys.

A previous product called the Wonder Tube worked similarly.  Instead of glasses, the device was in the form of a small telescope.

Their name was used as the inspiration for the UK punk band X-Ray Spex.

Similar useful devices
 Thermal imaging goggles are used by various military and police organizations.  They are intended for night use, but the longer wavelength of infrared light allows the user to see images through some materials that are impervious to visible light. Some video cameras have a night mode that gives an IR image under the right conditions. Digital cameras can also be used.
 Devices for airport security are able to see through clothing quite well.  Some of these are true X-ray devices, using backscatter X-rays.  The devices are not portable and use a typical X-ray display screen, not goggles.
 Cargo scanning includes the use of X-ray radiography, dual-energy X-ray radiography, backscatter X-ray radiography, muon radiography, muon tomography, neutron activation systems, or gamma-ray radiography.
 Terahertz imaging uses electromagnetic radiation in the terahertz or far infrared range to see through objects in a similar manner to X-rays. It is currently a very expensive new technology, and is being tested for use in customs inspection, firefighting, search and rescue and medical imaging.

See also
X-ray vision
Night vision goggles

References

External links
 Example of a comic book ad for X-ray specs 

American popular culture
Novelty items